Ashley Bendle (born 29 march 1997) is a Welsh submission grappler, Brazilian jiu-jitsu practitioner and competitor. A British and European No-Gi champion in coloured belts, Bendle is a black belt No-Gi World, European Open and  ADCC trials medalist.

Career 
Ashley Louise Bendle was born on 29 march 1997, she started training Brazilian jiu-jitsu (BJJ) at the age of five. After completing all the youth belts, she received her blue belt at age 16 and started competing in the adult division. Bendle trained in Swansea under Chris Rees, the first Welsh BJJ black belt. At 17 she won silver at the 2015 IBJJF European Open Championship, competing in the light feather (-53.5 kg) division.

After receiving her purple belt from Rees in 2015, Bendle became British featherweight champion and then won bronze at the European championship. In 2016 she won gold at the European No-Gi Championship. In 2018 she was one of six athletes to be sponsored by the UKBJJA to compete at the IBJJF European Championship in Lisbon where she won bronze. Bendle was promoted to black belt by Rees in 2019.

In September 2021, Bendle fought in the first edition of the ADCC Submission Fighting Championship European Trials taking place in Poland where she arrived second in the -60 kg category.

Competing at Polaris 18 on 27 November 2021, she defeated Kate Bacik via 1 Round Decision. At Polaris 21 on 24 September 2022, Bendle was asked, on just a week's notice, to replace Ffion Davies in a fight for the inaugural under 60 kg title, against multiple-time World and ADCC champion Michelle Nicolini. Bendle lost the fight by split decision but her performance in the match won praises.

At the 2022 IBJJF London International Open, she won two Openweight gold medals, defeating Raquel Ferreira da Silvain in the Gi final and Joanna Dineva in the No-Gi final. In 2022 she won silver at the European No-Gi Championship and bronze at the IBJJF World No-Gi Championship.

In January she won Silver at the 2023 Brazilian Jiu-Jitsu European Championship, after defeating Rafaela Rosa of Checkmat, competing in the featherweight division. Bendle trains alongside Polaris triple champion Ashley Williams.

On February 25, 2023, Bendle fought for the inaugural Enyo Grappling under 55kgs title against Sophia Cassella. She won the match by decision and became the promotion's first champion.

Championships and accomplishments 
Main Achievements (black belt level):
 IBJJF London International Open Champion (2022)
 IBJJF London International Open No-Gi Champion (2022)
 IBJJF London Fall International Open Champion (2022)
 IBJJF London Fall International Open No-Gi Champion (2022)
 IBJJF Paris International Open Champion (2022)
 IBJJF Paris Fall International Open Champion (2022)
 2nd place ADCC European Trial (2021)
 2nd place IBJJF European No-Gi Championship (2022)
 2nd place IBJJF London International Open (2022)
 2nd place IBJJF London International Open No-Gi (2022)
 3rd place IBJJF World No-Gi Championship (2022)
 3rd place IBJJF European Championship (2022 / 2023)
 3rd place IBJJF London International Open (2023)

Main Achievements (coloured belt level):
 IBJJF European No-Gi Champion (2016 purple)
 Naga Elite Gi champion (2017)
 British champion (2017 purple)
 2nd place IBJJF European Championship (2015 blue)
 2nd place IBJJF British National Championship (2015 purple)
 3rd place IBJJF European Championship (2019 brown)
 3rd place IBJJF European Championship (2018 purple)
 3rd place IBJJF European Championship (2016 purple)
 3rd place IBJJF British National Championship (2018 purple)

Instructor lineage 
Carlos Gracie > Helio Gracie > Carlos Gracie Jr > Braulio Estima > Chris Rees > Ashley Bendle

Notes

References

External links 
 All About Ashley Bendle
 A Statement on Inclusivity and Equality from the Female UK Jiu-Jitsu Black Belts

Welsh practitioners of Brazilian jiu-jitsu
Living people
People awarded a black belt in Brazilian jiu-jitsu
Welsh submission wrestlers
Sportspeople from Swansea
World No-Gi Brazilian Jiu-Jitsu Championship medalists
Female Brazilian jiu-jitsu practitioners
1997 births